Dendrometry is the branch of botany that is concerned with the measurement of the various dimensions of trees, such as their diameter, size, shape, age, overall volume, thickness of the bark, etc., as well as the statistical properties of tree stands, including measures of central tendency and dispersion of these quantities, wood density, or yearly growth, for instance.

The most frequent measurements acquired in the field include
 the Diameter at Breast Height (DBH)
 the height of the tree
 measures contraction and relaxation of vessels
 the horizontal dimension of the canopy

These key measurements are used to infer, through allometric relations, other tree properties that may be of greater interest but are harder to measure directly, such as the quantity of commercial wood retrievable, or the amount of carbon sequestered in the plants.

See also
 Field-Map - technology for dendrometric measurements
 Tree allometry

References
 Grosenbaugh, L. R. (1980) 'Avoiding Dendrometry Bias When Trees Lean or Taper', Forest Science, Vol. 26, No. 2, 203–215.
 Court-Picon, M., C. Gadbin-Henry, F. Guibal and M. Roux (2004) 'Dendrometry and morphometry of Pinus pinea L. in Lower Provence (France): adaptability and variability of provenances', Forest Ecology and Management, Vol. 194, No. 1-3, 319–333.
 Eionet GEMET Thesaurus

Dendrology